Yolanda Ortíz may refer to:
 Yolanda Ortíz (diver)
 Yolanda Ortiz (chemist)